Bryan Anthony van Putten (born September 15, 1985) is a Dutch Caribbean songwriter, singer, and guitarist. Born on the island of Aruba, he attended high school at the Colegio Arubano and studied classical and electric guitar at the Cas di Cultura under the tutelage of Ivan Jansen. In the summer of 2004, van Putten moved to Europe where he studied at the Erasmus University in the Netherlands and the Salamanca University in Spain.

Career stats

Bryan van Putten is the winner of the 2010 Audience Award during the Grote Prijs van Zuid-Holland ("Big prize of South-Holland"), in the singer-songwriter category. He has also opened for international acts such as Ben Mills (UK).

As a native of Aruba, his Caribbean heritage and Latin American influences can often be heard in the at times exotic rhythms of his music.

In 2011, Bryan van Putten was recorded live for television intermezzos by Oscar Langerak. These 4 films are still used and can be seen from time to time on regional broadcaster Open Rotterdam.

Bryan van Putten has collaborated with international and local artists and also recorded cross-overs with rappers Hitman & The General and has produced singles for local Aruban artists such as Rachel Kraaijvanger and Oslin Trimon.

As a resident at the Hemingway Social Club in Rotterdam from 2011 to 2013, van Putten could be seen performing regularly; most of the time accompanied by friends or allowing members of the audience to participate.

Early days
Van Putten took up the guitar as a child, beginning lessons at the age of nine. Although he wasn't fond of them, he stuck with it and learned to appreciate the instrument. At the age of 11, he joined the band "Dypers", becoming the vocalist. He moved on to composing and arranging music. His early entry into the bands started with Track One and Intra Muros.

Discography
Bryan van Putten released his most well known single on April 21, 2013. The song is entitled Spanish Heartbreak. The most recent release by Bryan van Putten is titled Lama. A song written and sung in his native language Papiamento. Lama was released on March 17, 2018.

References

1985 births
Living people
Aruban singers
21st-century Dutch male singers
21st-century Dutch singers